São Paulo Tramway, Light and Power Company, also known as Light São Paulo or simply Light, was a privately owned utility company operating in São Paulo, Brazil from 1899 until 1981.

History 
Canadians William Mackenzie and Frederick Stark Pearson founded the São Paulo Tramway, Light and Power Company in 1899. In 1900 Light São Paulo began operating the first tram line in the city of São Paulo which ran to Barra Funda.

Work began in 1901 on the hydroelectric plant in Santana de Parnaíba. It opened in 1905. In 1905 the company installed the first electric street lights on Rua Barão de Itapetininga. In 1906 the company constructed a reservoir at Guarapiranga. In 1907 they installed 50 more lights on Rua Direita, Rua 15 de Novembro, and Rua São Bento.

The company signed a contract with the state of São Paulo for the first time in 1911. By 1916 they had installed 8,605 gas lights and 864 electric street lamps in the city.

Successors

SPTL&P's tramways were acquired by Companhia Municipal de Transportes Coletivos in 1946, SPTL&P line disappeared in the early 1960s and eventually the city's remaining tram routes by 1968 with buses or trolleybuses.

In 1916 the telephone companies merged to create the Companhia Telefônica Brasileira (CTB) and now succeeded by what is now Telebrás.

During the 1930s, while Fábio da Silva Prado was mayor, electric light was brought to the rest of the city. This expansion continued under Prestes Maia in the following decades.

In 1947 the utility companies were nationalized.

In 1981 the city government under Mayor Paulo Maluf created Eletropaulo.

See also 

 Brookfield Asset Management
 Light S.A.
 Usina Hidrelétrica Edgard de Sousa 
 Companhia Telefônica Brasileira (CTB)

References 

Electric power companies of Brazil
Defunct energy companies of Brazil
Energy companies disestablished in 1981
Energy companies established in 1899
1899 establishments in Brazil
1981 disestablishments in Brazil